Beja (União das Freguesias de  Santiago Maior e São João Baptista) is a parish in the concelho  of Beja on Beja District, Portugal. It was formed in 2013 by the merger of the former parishes Santiago Maior and São João Baptista. The population in 2011 was 14,015, in an area of 51.27 km2.

References

Freguesias of Beja, Portugal